Shaina Garcia Magdayao (born November 6, 1989) is a Filipino actress, dancer, singer and model. She is currently working for Star Magic and a talent of ABS-CBN.

Magdayao is recognized as one of the country's premiere actresses and prettiest faces in showbiz. With a career spanning of over 25 years, she is recognized as the industry's "Gold Queen" of Philippine television and the "Dance royalty" of her generation. She has won countless accolades for her acting prowess including a FAMAS Award, MMFF Award for Best Supporting Actress and Gawad PASADO Award for Best Supporting Actress. 

Magdayao has starred in multiple blockbuster films in a lead role including: Four Sisters and a Wedding (₱145 million), Villa Estrella (₱50 million), and Shake, Rattle and Roll XII (₱60 million). Shaina Magdayao also starred in the 2020 critically acclaimed film "Tagpuan" which won for "Best film" at Wallachia International Film Festival in Romania and "Best feature film" at Chauri Chaura International Film Festival in India.

Career
At age 7, Shaina Magdayao made her acting debut as the titular protagonist in the Philippine drama series Lyra in GMA Network. She later joined Kaybol before starring in ABS-CBN's afternoon drama series Marinella, playing the role of Rina. In 2000, when Magdayao was 11 years old, she released a self-titled debut album with Star Records. The carrier single was "Sayaw Sweet Lullabye". In the same year, she starred in Laurice Guillen's film Tanging Yaman, where she won a Best Child Actress award from the Filipino Academy of Movie Arts and Sciences Awards. She received an award for her role in  Ang Tanging Ina. Other awards under Magdayao's belt include the Best Child Performer award from the Parangal ng Bayan in 1999, and Best New TV Personality in the 1999 Star Awards.

In 2005, she was included in the cast of the Philippine primetime drama series Ikaw ang Lahat sa Akin along with ABS-CBN's brightest stars such as Claudine Barretto, Diether Ocampo, Angelika dela Cruz, Bea Alonzo and John Lloyd Cruz.  She was also one of the lead casts of Erik Matti's television series, Rounin, under Chito S. Roño's direction, via ABS-CBN in 2006.

She is part of the regular cast at ABS-CBN's Sunday afternoon show, ASAP. She starred in Kambal sa Uma, an afternoon drama series on ABS-CBN.
 
In 2010, she starred in her very first solo lead role in the afternoon soap opera Alyna. The show's critical success gave Magdayao the title ABS-CBN's ‘Kapamilya Gold’ Queen.

Magdayao starred in the OFW-themed series Kung Ako'y Iiwan Mo with Jake Cuenca. In 2013, she was added to the main cast of Juan dela Cruz.

In 2015, she was paired with Gerald Anderson on the New York Festival-nominated family television series about angels Nathaniel. She headlined Cinema One's first breakthrough series about millennials "Single/Single" as Joee.

In 2016, she played Billie Pono, the female lead of Quantum Films' "My CandiDate" with Derek Ramsay. She joined  Book 2 of The Story of Us as Lucia Cristobal. She rehashed her role as Joee on the second season of Single/Single.

Shaina stars alongside the daytime drama queen Julia Montes in Asintado, where the portray the Ramirez Siblings.

She also starred in FPJ's Ang Probinsyano.

Filmography

Television

Film

Charity work
Shaina Magdayao works with diverse NGO's and orphanages such as Hospicio de San Jose and St. Luke Reach Out Foundation. In 2014, using her own funds and donations from her friends in and out of the show-business, she went to remote Typhoon Yolanda-stricken towns and brought relief goods to those who were affected. On her recent trip to Italy in 2015, she stayed in a convent at San Giovanni Rotondo and served children with terminal illnesses.

In 2013, Magdayao joined the PETA campaign, Free Mali. Mali is the only captive elephant in the Philippines; residing at Manila Zoo where she is alone, in a tiny enclosure and in need of adequate care. The campaign focus is to have her moved from the zoo to Boon Lott's Elephant Sanctuary.

Awards and nominations

References

External links

1989 births
Living people
People from Quezon City
People from Bogo, Cebu
Cebuano people
Actresses from Cebu
Filipino people of American descent
Filipino people of Scottish descent
Filipino people of Spanish descent
Filipino child actresses
Filipino women comedians
Filipino film actresses
Filipino television actresses
GMA Network personalities
ABS-CBN personalities
Star Magic
Visayan people
Filipino female dancers
20th-century Filipino actresses
21st-century Filipino actresses